Define  as the 2-dimensional metric space of constant curvature .

Let  be a metric space.

Such a triangle is unique up to isometry. 

References
 M Bridson & A Haefliger - Metric Spaces Of Non-Positive Curvature, 

Metric geometry